Bir-e Bala (also Romanized as Bīr-e Bālā; also known as Bālād) is a village in Kahir Rural District, in the Central District of Konarak County, Sistan and Baluchestan Province, Iran. At the 2006 census, its population was 181, in 47 families.

References 

Populated places in Konarak County